Mai-Mai, commonly spelled Maay Maay (also known as Af-Maay, Af-Maymay, or simply Maay; the Mai-Mai spelling is rarely used but it is most often spoken), is a dialect of the Somali language of the Cushitic branch of the Afro-Asiatic family. It is mainly spoken in Somalia and adjacent parts of Ethiopia and Kenya. In Somalia, it is spoken in South West state, Jubaland state, and Banadir. It is one of the dialects of the Somali language.

Overview
Somali linguistic varieties are divided into three main groups: Northern, Benadir, and Maay. Northern Somali (or Northern-Central Somali) forms the basis for Standard Somali.

Maay is principally spoken by the Digil and Mirifle (Rahanweyn) clans in the southern regions of Somalia, particularly in South West. Its speech area extends from the southwestern border with Ethiopia to a region close to the coastal strip between Mogadishu and Kismayo, including the city of Baidoa. Maay is not mutually comprehensible with Northern Somali or Benadir, and it differs considerably in sentence structure and phonology. It is also not generally used in education or media. However, Maay speakers often use Standard Somali as a lingua franca. It is learned via mass communications, internal migration, and urbanisation.

Although past scholars have maintained the assumption that Maay is not mutually comprehensible with Northern Somali it was done so without it being tested for. A more recent study by Deqa Hassan tested the mutual intelligibility between Af-Maay and Af-Maxaa speakers (Northern Somali).  

The study found that Af-Maay is partially mutually intelligible to Af-Maxaa (Northern Speakers) and that intelligibility increases with increased understanding of Standard Somali. Which implies understanding of standard Somali (Northern Somali) increases the chance of understanding Af-Maay. This accounts for the most significant linguistic factor that ties both language variations together. Therefore Af-Maay is categorized as a Type 5 dialect for the overlapping common cultural history it shares with Af Maxaa speakers which explains its somewhat mutual intelligibility.

Grammar

Phonology

Consonants 

A nasal consonant preceding a /n/ sound will always be realized as a [ŋ] sound. A [ɣ] sound is an intervocalic allophone of /ɡ/.

Vowels 

Maay Maay exhibits significant amounts of epenthesis, inserting central or high-central vowels to break up consonant clusters. Vowel length is contrastive; minimal pairs such as bur 'flour' and buur 'mountain' are attested.

Words
Maay Maay is fairly agglutinative. It has complex verb forms, inflecting at least for tense/aspect and person/number of both subject and object. There is also a prefix indicating negation. In addition, verbs exhibit derivational morphology, including a causative and an applicative. Nominal morphology includes a definiteness suffix, whose form depends on the gender of the head noun, and possessive suffixes.

Sentences
Maay Maay exhibits SVO and SOV word orders, apparently in fairly free variation. When the object is postverbal, the prefix maay appears on the verb. Within the noun phrase, the head noun is generally initial. Possessors, adjectives and some strong quantifiers follow the head noun. Numerals and the indefinite quantifier precede the head noun.

Poetry
Maay has retained a rich oral tradition and evocative poetry that differed from the more well known northern style. In southern Somalia the poet and reciter would be one and the same. British ethnologist Virginia Luling noted during her visit to Afgooye that poetry was to be conceived and recited simultaneously with no prior preparation. The poets or Laashin relied on their wit and memory to construct beautiful poems and entertain the audience.

Geledi Laashins during Luling's 1989 stay in Afgooye sang about the ever present issue of land theft by the Somali government. The Sultan in these poems was asked to help the community and reminded of his legendary Gobroon forefathers of the centuries prior.

The poem The law then was not this law was performed by the leading Laashins of Afgooye, Hiraabey, Muuse Cusmaan and Abukar Cali Goitow alongside a few others, addressed to the current leader Sultan Subuge. It evoked the memories of the mighty Geledi Sultanate of years prior and was a sharp contrast to their current situation.

Here the richest selection of the poem

References

External links
Cultural Orientation Resource Center

East Cushitic languages
Somali language
Languages of Somalia
Languages of Ethiopia